Masato Kobayashi may refer to:

Masato (kickboxer) (born 1979), former Japanese welterweight kickboxer
Masato Kobayashi (baseball) (born 1980), Japanese baseball pitcher